This is a list of fellows of the Royal Society elected in its 14th year, 1673.

Fellows 
John Le Gassick  (d. 1674)
Giles Strangways  (1615–1675)
Rowland Winn  (1609–1676)
Sir Richard Ford  (1613–1678)
Sir Thomas Player  (d. 1686)
Andrew Birch  (1652–1691)
Sir John Lawrence  (d. 1692)
Edward Bernard  (1638–1697)
Charles Somerset Marquess of Worcester (1660–1698)
John Stafford Howard  (d. 1714)
Gottfried Wilhelm von Leibniz  (1646–1716)
Francis Robartes  (1650–1718)

References

1673
1673 in science
1673 in England